Gramoz Kurtaj (born 30 April 1991) is a Kosovan professional footballer who plays as a midfielder for German Oberliga Schleswig-Holstein club TSB Flensburg.

Early and personal life
Kurtaj was born in Pristina, SFR Yugoslavia. When Kosovo started playing international matches in 2016, Kurtaj said he had made himself available for selection by the national team.

He is friends with ex-Hamilton player Tomáš Černý.

Career
Kurtaj spent his early career in Germany with Hertha BSC II, TSG Neustrelitz and Carl Zeiss Jena, and in the Czech Republic with Baník Most. In July 2015 he was one of four players to sign for Scottish club Hamilton Academical. Kurtaj scored his first Hamilton goal four minutes into a 2–1 defeat to champions Celtic, scoring a header to make it 1–0 Hamilton at the time. He was released by Hamilton at the end of the 2016–17 season.

Style of play
Kurtaj has been compared to ex-Hamilton player Tony Andreu.

Career statistics

References

External links

1991 births
German people of Kosovan descent
Living people
German footballers
Association football midfielders
Hertha BSC II players
TSG Neustrelitz players
FC Carl Zeiss Jena players
FK Baník Most players
Hamilton Academical F.C. players
SHB Da Nang FC players
Thanh Hóa FC players
SC Gjilani players
Nam Định F.C. players
Regionalliga players
Oberliga (football) players
Czech National Football League players
Scottish Premier League players
V.League 1 players
Football Superleague of Kosovo players
German expatriate footballers
German expatriate sportspeople in the Czech Republic
Expatriate footballers in the Czech Republic
German expatriate sportspeople in Scotland
Expatriate footballers in Scotland
German expatriate sportspeople in Vietnam
Expatriate footballers in Vietnam